The Majestic Line (Scotland) Ltd, West Coast Cruises, is a private cruise line with its headquarters in the Sandbank Marina on the Cowal Peninsula in the West of Scotland.  Founded in 2004, it is named after a fictional shipping company that featured in Neil Munro's Tales of Para Handy. 

, the line operates cruises from Oban to the Outer Hebrides, North West Coast Mainland, through the heart of Scotland via the Caledonian Canal, the Island of Mull, the Isle of Skye and the Small Isles, Islands of the Clyde (Firth of Clyde) and the Inner Hebrides.

Fleet
The company runs a fleet of four vessels, Glen Massan and Glen Tarsan are converted fishing trawlers, Glen Etive and Glen Shiel are purpose-built vessels, that have the look and feel of a 1930s “gentleman’s motor yacht”.

See also

Cruising (maritime)
List of cruise lines

References

External links
The Majestic Line
"Goodbye check-in, hello world" – review in The Guardian of a cruise on the Glen Massan.
"Mini-cruise: A perfect way to test the waters" – review in The Daily Telegraph, London, of a cruise on the Glen Massan.
"Sailing in search of serenity" – review in The Sydney Morning Herald of a cruise on the Glen Massan.

Companies based in Argyll and Bute
Cruise lines
Shipping companies of Scotland
Cowal